Anolis ricordii, the Haitian giant anole or Haitian green anole, is a species of lizard in the family Dactyloidae. The species is found in Haiti and the Dominican Republic.

References

Anoles
Reptiles described in 1837
Reptiles of Haiti
Reptiles of the Dominican Republic
Taxa named by André Marie Constant Duméril
Taxa named by Gabriel Bibron